Winston Frederick Sterzel, also known by his YouTube pseudonym SerpentZA, is a South African vlogger and video producer. He lived in Shenzhen in the Guangdong province of China for fourteen years. His videos cover a variety of topics relating to life in China from a Westerner's perspective.

Early life

Sterzel is of British heritage and was born and raised in South Africa. He moved to China to work as an English teacher after first visiting on business in 2005.

Career in China

In 2015, he was one of twelve South Africans in China profiled by China Radio International. He started uploading videos in China in 2007, and became a full-time vlogger in 2016. His videos primarily focus on life in China as viewed from a Westerner's perspective.

Sterzel has also made videos about motorcycle trips through China. With fellow YouTuber Matthew Tye (who goes by Laowhy86) and other friends, he has taken extended journeys and produced documentary series titled Conquering Southern China and Conquering Northern China.  He and Tye operate the YouTube channel ADVChina, a motorcycle travel vlog. Sterzel was also co-founder of a small, China-based custom motorcycle business, Churchill Custom Motorcycles, that is no longer in business. In late 2018, he said he desired to create "positive content" about China, but that a negative interaction with the Chinese police spurred him to move out of China.

Career after leaving China

In 2019, Sterzel moved to Los Angeles because he felt that he would lose his life or be incarcerated in China allegedly following threats by ultranationalist Internet users, who apparently accused Sterzel's wife of being a spy and a threat to national security.

Following his departure from China, Sterzel's YouTube channel took a sharp turn into criticism of the Chinese government, using hyperbolic video titles such as "How China is slowly KILLING us all."

References

External links
 
 
 Winston Sterzel's channel on Youku

1980 births
Video bloggers
Living people
South African expatriates in China
People from Cape Town
People from the Western Cape
White South African people
European South African
South African people of European descent
People from Shenzhen